Mongar District (Dzongkha: མོང་སྒར་རྫོང་ཁག་; Wylie: Mong-sgar rdzong-khag) is one of the 20 dzongkhags (districts) comprising Bhutan. Mongar is the fastest-developing dzongkhag in eastern Bhutan. A regional hospital has been constructed and the region is bustling with many economic activities. Mongar is noted for its lemon grass, a plant that can be used to produce an essential oil. It also has a hydroelectric power-plant on the Kuri Chhu river. Mongar is notable for having the longest work time in all the dzongkhags of Bhutan.

Languages

Mongar is home to a variety of Bhutanese languages and dialects. In the east, the East Bodish Tshangla (Sharchopkha) is the dominant language, also used as a regional lingua franca.

Central Mongar is the only region where the East Bodish Chali language is spoken, by about at total of 8,200 people in Wangmakhar, Gorsum and Tormazhong villages, mainly in and around Chhali Gewog on the east bank of the Kuri Chhu River.

Southern Mongar is likewise unique for its 1,000 Gongduk speakers living in a few inaccessible villages of Gongdue Gewog near the Kuri Chhu river. The language appears to be the sole representative of a unique branch of the Tibeto-Burman language family  and retains the complex verbal agreement system of Proto-Tibeto-Burman.

In southwestern Mongar, residents speak Khengkha, an East Bodish language closely related to Bumthangkha languages including Kurtöp. Bumthangkha itself is also spoken by the natives of extreme northwest Mongar. Residents of the Kuri Chhu valley of northern Mongar speak Chochangachakha language, a Central Bodish language very closely related to Dzongkha, the national language.

Administrative divisions
Mongar is divided into seventeen village blocks (or gewogs):

Balam Gewog
Chaskhar Gewog
Chhali Gewog
Drametse Gewog
Drepung Gewog
Gongdue Gewog
Jurmey Gewog
Kengkhar Gewog
Mongar Gewog
Narang Gewog
Ngatshang Gewog
Saleng Gewog
Sherimung Gewog
Silambi Gewog
Thangrong Gewog
Tsakaling Gewog
Tsamang Gewog

Geography
The Western Mongar District contains part of the Thrumshingla National Park (the gewogs of Saling and the Tsamang) and the northeastern Mongar District contains part of the Bumdeling Wildlife Sanctuary (the gewog of Sharmung).

The Kuri Chhu river flows through the Mongar District valley. The Kuri Chhu, a major river of eastern Bhutan, is a tributary of the Manas River system, which is the largest river in Bhutan and a major tributary of the Brahmaputra River, the waterway that drains most of the eastern region.

See also
Districts of Bhutan
Kurtoed Province
Kurmaed Province
Thrumshing La
Kuri Chhu

References

 
Districts of Bhutan